Ramon Casas and Pere Romeu on a Tandem is a painting by Ramon Casas in exhibition at the National Art Museum of Catalonia in Barcelona.

Description
Casas painted Ramon Casas and Pere Romeu on a Tandem in 1897 specifically for the interior of Els Quatre Gats, a bar that was at the center of the Modernisme art movement in Barcelona. It depicts Casas and Pere Romeu, one of the promoters of Els Quatre Gats, on a tandem bicycle against the Barcelona skyline. Casas is seen in profile with his pipe, while Romeu looks directly at the viewer. Although painted on canvas, the composition has the graphic quality of a huge poster with its bold drawing and simplified forms, reflecting the fact that the artist was a skilled poster designer and illustrator.

The original inscription in Catalan on the right side of the painting, which was later cut off, read "to ride a bicycle, you can't go with your back straight." The message described the attitude of the bar founders (two of whom are depicted here), that in order to make progress, you must break with tradition, as was done at Els Quatre Gats. In 1901, this painting was replaced with another large composition by Casas, entitled Ramon Casas and Pere Romeu in an Automobile, in which the tandem bicycle has given way to a car, symbolizing the new century. When reproductions of the two paintings appeared in the magazine Pel & Ploma, they were referred to as The End of the 19th Century and The Beginning of the 20th Century, respectively.

Exhibition history

Notes

References
 Doñate, Mercè; Mendoza, Cristina: Ramon Casas. El pintor del modernisme. MNAC. 2001.  (in Catalan)
McCully, M. (1978) Els Quatre Gats: Art in Barcelona around 1900. Princeton University Press, Princeton.
Robinson, W., Falgas, J., & Lord, C.B. (2007) Barcelona and Modernity: Picasso, Gaudi, Miró, Dalí. Cleveland Museum of Art in Association with Yale University Press, New Haven and London.

Further reading
 Garcia, J.M. (1996) From Gaudi to Tàpies: Catalan Masters of the 20th Century. Generalitat de Catalunya, Departament de Cultura.
 Lord, C.B. (1995) Point and Counterpoint: Ramon Casas in Paris and Barcelona 1866-1909. The University of Michigan, Ann Arbor.

External links
 Ramon Casas and Pere Romeu on a Tandem on the National Art Museum of Catalonia website
 Ramon Casas and Pere Romeu on a Tandem and In an Automobile on the National Art Museum of Catalonia's YouTube channel
Ramon Casas and Pere Romeu on a Tandem on Google Art Project

Paintings in the collection of the Museu Nacional d'Art de Catalunya
Paintings by Ramón Casas
1897 paintings
Bicycles in art
Modernisme